The Thomaston class was a class of eight dock landing ships built for the United States Navy in the 1950s.

The class is named after a town of Thomaston, Maine, which was the home of General Henry Knox, the first Secretary of War to serve under the United States Constitution.

Design
The Thomaston class was the third class of U.S. Navy dock landing ships. The class was designed under project SCB 75 and approved in the early 1950s. The class was designed to be able to transport:
 3 Landing Craft Utility, or
 9 LCM-8 Landing Craft Mechanized, or
 16 LCM-6, or
 ca. 50 LVT-5 or later LVTP-7.
The dock was covered by removable segments that were able to carry the weight of two medium helicopters. Both cranes could lift weights of up to 50 tons. The machinery spaces were located underneath the dock, in contrast to the earlier Ashland class, where the machinery spaces were located to port and starboard of the dock.

Originally, all ships were armed with eight 3"/50 caliber gun Mark 33 twin mounts. The number was later reduced.

 was a trial ship for the Jeff(A) and Jeff(B) landing craft in the mid-1980s. Jeff(B) was then developed into the Landing Craft Air Cushion.

Ships in class

References

Amphibious warfare vessel classes
 
 Thomaston class dock landing ship
 Thomaston class dock landing ship
Thomaston, Maine